Jaime Alberto Rodríguez Jiménez (born 17 January 1959) is a former football player from El Salvador.

He represented his country at the 1982 FIFA World Cup in Spain.

Playing career

Club career
From a very early age on, Rodríguez showed great skill and talent. After being selected by C.D. Juventud Olímpica Metalio then Alianza, he began a prolific football career, in the process becoming a legend in El Salvador, although not as highly rated as Mágico González.

A defender, Rodríguez played professionally for different clubs around the world. Among these were El Salvador's Alianza, Mexico's Club Léon and F.C. Atlas, and Germany's Bayer Uerdingen (now known as KFC Uerdingen 05). He also played for teams in Japan's NKK, Yokohama Flügels and Finland's KPV scoring 4 goals in 18 games during 1984–1985.

International career
Nicknamed La Chelona, Rodríguez has represented his country in 15 FIFA World Cup qualification matches and played in all three of his country's matches at the 1982 FIFA World Cup in Spain.

His final international game was an April 1991 UNCAF Nations Cup qualification match against Nicaragua.

Managerial career
After retiring from football, Rodríguez started a coaching career at Alianza, but was sacked in 2002. Since then, he has been a strong advocate for improvement in football organisations and programs in El Salvador. He has also been a strong supporter for financial aid to Salvadoran sporting heroes of the past who are in need.

Since 2009, he is President of the Salvadoran Institute of Sport (INDES) and was appointed coordinator of the El Salvador national team and in 2007 became the assistant coach of the Cuscatlecos.

Rodríguez has participated in a charity match to raise funds for earthquake victims in his native El Salvador.

In 2012, Rodríguez was named member of the football commission of FIFA.

Club statistics

Honours

Individual honours
 Named the Top 25 Players in 1986
 Selection of the CONCACAF

References

External links

1959 births
Living people
Sportspeople from San Salvador
Salvadoran footballers
El Salvador international footballers
1982 FIFA World Cup players
Alianza F.C. footballers
C.D. FAS footballers
KFC Uerdingen 05 players
Club León footballers
Atlas F.C. footballers
NKK SC players
Yokohama Flügels players
Liga MX players
Veikkausliiga players
Japan Soccer League players
J1 League players
Salvadoran expatriate footballers
Expatriate footballers in West Germany
Expatriate footballers in Mexico
Expatriate footballers in Finland
Expatriate footballers in Japan
Salvadoran expatriate sportspeople in Mexico
Salvadoran expatriate sportspeople in West Germany
Salvadoran expatriate sportspeople in Japan
Kokkolan Palloveikot players
Association football defenders
Salvadoran expatriate sportspeople in Finland